John Millman was the defending champion but decided not to participate.

Martin Fischer won the title, defeating Tatsuma Ito in the final, 3–6, 7–5, 6–4

Seeds

Draw

Finals

Top half

Bottom half

References
 Main Draw
 Qualifying Draw

All Japan Indoor Tennis Championships - Singles
2014 Singles